Svenn Thorkild Stray (11 February 1922 – 20 May 2012) was a Norwegian politician and a member of the Conservative Party of Norway. He served as a member of parliament from 1958 to 1985, as president of the Nordic Council in 1968, and as foreign minister of Norway from 1970 to 1971, and 1981 to 1986.

Background

He was born in Arendal. Stray's parents were Gudmund Stray (1885–1970), a dentist, and Anne Johanne Marie Frøstrup (1893–1975). Svenn Stray graduated from the University of Oslo with a law degree in 1946. After having served as a clerk in Moss, Norway, he opened his own practice in Moss in 1950.

Political career
Stray was first elected to local office in Moss in 1955, and he remained active in local politics until 1979. He was elected to Stortinget in 1958. He served continuously in the parliament until 1985, for a total of 27 years, 264 days.

Stray was foreign minister twice, from 1970 to 1971, and 1981 to 1986. He died on 20 May 2012 at the age of 90.

References

Foreign Ministers of Norway
Government ministers of Norway
Norwegian diplomats
Conservative Party (Norway) politicians
Members of the Storting
Vice Presidents of the Storting
20th-century Norwegian politicians
People from Arendal
1922 births
2012 deaths